Sunderland South was, from 1950 until 2010, a constituency represented in the House of Commons of the Parliament of the United Kingdom. It elected one Member of Parliament (MP) by the first past the post system of election.

History
Sunderland South, as can be inferred from the name, formed the southern part of the County Borough (now City) of Sunderland. The constituency was created by the Representation of the People Act 1948 for the 1950 general election when the existing two-member Sunderland seat was split in two. Parts also transferred from Houghton-le-Spring.

It was abolished for the 2010 general election when most of its contents were divided between the two new constituencies of Sunderland Central (eastern areas) and Houghton and Sunderland South (western areas). St Anne's ward was transferred to the new constituency of Washington and Sunderland West.

Boundaries

1950–1955 

 The County Borough of Sunderland wards of Bishopwearmouth, Hendon, Humbledon, Pallion, Park, St Michael's, Sunderland East, Thornhill, and West.

1955–1974 

 The County Borough of Sunderland wards of Bishopwearmouth, Hendon, Humbledon, Pallion, Park, Pennywell, St Michael's, Thorney Close, and Thornhill.

Minor changes.

1974–1983 

 The County Borough of Sunderland wards of Bishopwearmouth, Hendon, Humbledon, Pennywell, Ryhope, St Chad's, St Michael's, Silksworth, Thorney Close, and Thornhill.

Boundaries expanded southwards in line with those of the County Borough, including the gain of Ryhope and Silksworth from Houghton-le-Spring.  Existing boundary with Sunderland North realigned, including the loss of Pallion ward.

1983–1997 

 The Metropolitan Borough of Sunderland wards of Grindon, Hendon, Ryhope, St Chad's, St Michael's, Silksworth, Thorney Close, and Thornholme. Minor changes to take account of new ward boundaries.

1997–2010 

 The City of Sunderland wards of Grindon, Hendon, St Chad's, St Michael's, Silksworth, South Hylton, Thorney Close, and Thornholme. South Hylton ward transferred from Sunderland North. Ryhope ward transferred to the new constituency of Houghton and Washington East.

Political history
Having been a Labour–Conservative marginal in the 1950s and 1960s, Sunderland South was held by the Labour Party from 1964 until 2010. Its last MP was journalist-politician Chris Mullin, who served between the 1987 and 2010 general elections, inclusive. Sunderland South was abolished as a result of the Fifth Periodic Review of Westminster constituencies, which took effect at the 2010 election. Mullin did not seek re-election in 2010.

The constituency was well known for trying to be the first seat to declare its results, doing so in the general elections of 1992, 1997, 2001 and 2005.

Members of Parliament

Elections

Elections in the 1950s

Elections in the 1960s

Elections in the 1970s

Elections in the 1980s

Elections in the 1990s

Elections in the 2000s

See also
History of parliamentary constituencies and boundaries in Tyne and Wear
History of parliamentary constituencies and boundaries in Durham

Notes and references

Parliamentary constituencies in Tyne and Wear (historic)
Politics of the City of Sunderland
Constituencies of the Parliament of the United Kingdom established in 1950
Constituencies of the Parliament of the United Kingdom disestablished in 2010
Sunderland